The 1959 World Table Tennis Championships women's singles was the 25th edition of the women's singles championship.
Kimiyo Matsuzaki defeated Fujie Eguchi in the final by three sets to one, to win the title.

Results

See also
List of World Table Tennis Championships medalists

References

-
1959 in women's table tennis
Table